Kelley Deal (born June 10, 1961) is an American musician and singer. She has been the lead guitarist and co-vocalist of the alternative rock band the Breeders since 1992, and has formed her own side-projects with bands such as R. Ring and the Kelley Deal 6000. She is the identical twin sister of the Breeders' lead singer and former Pixies bassist and co-vocalist Kim Deal.

In 2020, Deal joined the post-punk band Protomartyr in a touring capacity, after collaborating with the band on their 2018 EP, Consolation.

Early life 
Kelley Deal was born in Dayton, Ohio, United States, 11 minutes before her twin sister Kim Deal. The Deal twins grew up in Huber Heights, a suburb of Dayton. The sisters first played together in their late teens, Kim playing guitar and both sisters singing Hank Williams songs in biker bars.

In 1986, Kim joined the Pixies in Boston. She paid for Kelley to fly to Boston and audition as drummer. Though the Pixies songwriter, Black Francis, approved, Kelley was not confident in her drumming and was more interested in playing songs written by Kim. Kelley worked as a defence contractor at an air force base.

Musical career 
In 1989, Kim Deal and Tanya Donelly (lead guitarist of Throwing Muses) formed the first incarnation of The Breeders. Kim invited Kelley to join the band for their debut album, Pod, but Kelley could not get time off from work.

The Breeders 
In 1992, Kelley joined the Breeders as third guitarist, even though she did not really know how to play. The Safari EP was the first recording on which she appeared. Guitarist Tanya Donelly left to form Belly a little after the release of Safari. Kim suggested Kelley should be the band's new drummer. After Kelley insisted on lead guitar, Kim gave her a crash course on all the songs in the band's set. Kelley picked up quickly and learned all the lead parts on Pod and the new parts on the album they were about to record, Last Splash. A new drummer from Dayton, Jim MacPherson, joined them. After Last Splash was released in 1993, the band toured, opening for Nirvana, and also got a slot on the Lollapalooza tour in 1994.

Other projects 

After Last Splash, Kelley started the Kelley Deal 6000. The band released two albums on Eel's Nice Records label, Go To The Sugar Altar in 1996 and Boom! Boom! Boom! in 1997, and went on hiatus when The Breeders were reunited.

Kelley also joined The Last Hard Men with Skid Row singer Sebastian Bach, Smashing Pumpkins drummer Jimmy Chamberlin, and Jimmy Flemion of The Frogs. She played bass for them and they recorded an eponymous album in 1997, which was released in a limited edition on Eel's own label, Nice Records, and in 2001 on Spitfire Records.

She teamed back up with her sister in the late 1990s and began recording new demos for the Breeders. With a new line up, they released Title TK in 2002. Title TK features three songs recorded in 1999, where the Deal sisters played all the instruments. In April 2008, The Breeders released Mountain Battles. All Nerve followed in 2018.

She has been knitting in recent years. She specializes in knitted handbags, which she sells on her website, and appeared on the DIY Network knitting show Knitty Gritty, and in 2008 released a book of her knitting handbag patterns, Bags That Rock: Knitting on the Road with Kelley Deal. One of her patterns is included in the DIY Network's book Knitty Gritty Knits: 25 Fun & Fabulous Projects'''.

She co-wrote and played guitar on Magnetophone's "Kel's Vintage Thought". She has also performed duets with Kris Kristofferson and Supersuckers (notably, Hungover Together on Must've Been High), and has also played in the band R. Ring. In January 2020, Deal joined the band Protomartyr as a touring member for their 2020 midwest tour. Deal has previously collaborated on the band's records, doing vocals on 'a couple' of songs.

 Drug problems 
In 1994, Kelley was arrested for heroin possession; she had been using since she was a teenager. She went through drug rehabilitation throughout the following year. In a February 2018 feature article, The New York Times reported that Kelley was in her eighth year of sobriety.

 Discography 

 The Breeders 
 Safari (EP, 1992)
 Last Splash (1993)
 Live in Stockholm 1994 (1994)
 Head to Toe (EP, 1994)
 Title TK (2002)
 Mountain Battles (2008)
 Fate to Fatal (EP, 2009)
 All Nerve (2018)

 The Kelley Deal 6000 
 Go to the Sugar Altar (1996)
 Boom! Boom! Boom! (1997)

 The Last Hard Men 
 The Last Hard Men (1998/2001)

 R. Ring 
 "Fallout & Fire" b/w "SEE" (2012)
 The Rise EP (2013)
 Ignite The Rest (2017)
 War Poems, We Rested'' (2023)

Bibliography

References

External links 
 

Living people
1961 births
4AD artists
American women rock singers
Musicians from Dayton, Ohio
American indie rock musicians
Identical twins
Singers from Ohio
The Breeders members
American computer programmers
American twins
People from Huber Heights, Ohio
Twin musicians
Guitarists from Ohio
20th-century American guitarists
21st-century American women singers
The Last Hard Men (band) members
Misra Records artists
21st-century American singers
20th-century American women guitarists